John Norman Nelson (28 May 1908 – 20 June 1991) was an Australian politician. Born in Bundaberg, Queensland, he was the son of politician Harold Nelson. Jock Nelson was educated at state schools in Darwin before becoming a jackeroo and goldminer, and later a bore contractor at Alice Springs. After serving in the military from 1942 to 1945, he became a pastoralist. In 1949, he was elected to the Australian House of Representatives as the Labor member for Northern Territory, defeating the sitting independent, Adair Blain. At this time, the member for Northern Territory could only vote on matters relating to the Territory itself. In 1963, he was re-elected unopposed, the last occasion when a member was returned to the House of Representatives in this fashion. He retired in 1966, an occasion used by the Country Party to take the seat. Nelson returned to pastoralism and served as the first Mayor of Alice Springs (1971 - 1973) before he stepped down to become the Administrator of the Northern Territory (1973–1975) before his death in 1991.

See also
 Darwin Rebellion

References

1908 births
1991 deaths
Australian Labor Party members of the Parliament of Australia
Members of the Australian House of Representatives for Northern Territory
Members of the Australian House of Representatives
Members of the Northern Territory Legislative Council
Administrators of the Northern Territory
20th-century Australian politicians